Torrylin Cairn is the remains of a Neolithic chambered tomb. It is located near Kilmory on the Isle of Arran in Scotland.

Description
Torrylin Cairn is situated beside Kilmory Water just south of the hamlet of Lagg.

The cairn has been interfered with by stone robbing and later dumping of field stones and its original shape and size are uncertain. The tomb would probably have had a crescent-shaped forecourt, framed by a façade of slender upright stones.

Antiquarian excavations in the 19th century uncovered an elongated burial chamber, divided into four compartments. Only the innermost compartment was intact. It contained the remains of six adults, a child and an infant. Beside them lay a flint tool and a fragment of pottery.

References

External links

Isle of Arran
Archaeological sites in North Ayrshire
Historic Scotland properties in North Ayrshire
Scheduled Ancient Monuments in North Ayrshire